Khamphao Ernthavanh (born 20 November 1961) is Lao diplomat and politician who is a former Lao Deputy Director of the Department of International Finance of the Ministry of Foreign Affairs, Deputy Minister of Foreign Affairs of Laos. Since 2019, she has been the ambassador of Laos to China.

Biography
Ernthavanh was born on 20 November 1961 in Xiangkhouang Province, Laos.

In June 2015, Ernthavanh was appointed as Deputy Minister of Foreign Affairs of Laos. On 27 September 2019, Ernthavanh was appointed as the new Lao ambassador to China and arrived in Beijing. On November 22, she presented her credentials to President Xi Jinping.

Personal life
In addition to her native Lao, Ernthavanh speaks Vietnamese, Russian and English. She is married with two children.

References 

1961 births
Living people
People from Xiangkhouang province
20th-century Laotian women politicians
20th-century Laotian politicians
21st-century Laotian women politicians
21st-century Laotian politicians
Ambassadors of Laos to China